David Wilson (died 20 July 1998) was a convicted murderer and the second person to be executed by Saint Kitts and Nevis since it became a sovereign state in 1983.

In February 1996, Wilson and Clement Thomas were convicted of beating a security guard to death in 1994. Wilson was sentenced to death by the trial judge, and his appeal was rejected by the appeal court. After the appeal court's judgment, Governor-General Sir Cuthbert Sebastian signed Wilson's death warrant, and he was executed by hanging on 20 July 1998. It was the first execution in Saint Kitts and Nevis since 1985.

Wilson's execution was controversial because it was carried out before he was able to appeal his case to the Judicial Committee of the Privy Council in London, which is the supreme court for Saint Kitts and Nevis.

References
Hans Göran Franck, Klas Nyman, and William Schabas (2003). The Barbaric Punishment: Abolishing the Death Penalty (Leiden: Martinus Nijhoff Publishers ) p. 118

External links
Amnesty International, "St Kitts and Nevis: First hanging in 13 years – a backward step for the Caribbean", press release, 1998-07-20, accessed 2008-08-08

1998 deaths
People executed by Saint Kitts and Nevis by hanging
Executed Saint Kitts and Nevis people
20th-century executions by Saint Kitts and Nevis
People executed for murder
People convicted of murder by Saint Kitts and Nevis
Saint Kitts and Nevis people convicted of murder
Year of birth missing